The Roman Catholic Diocese of Njombe is a diocese located in Njombe in the Ecclesiastical province of Songea in Tanzania.

History
 February 16, 1968: Established as Diocese of Njombe from the Diocese of Iringa and Territorial Abbacy of Peramiho

Bishops

Ordinaries
 Bishops of Njombe (Roman rite)
 Bishop Raymond Mwanyika (16 January 1971 – 8 June 2002)
 Bishop Alfred Leonhard Maluma (8 June 2002 – 6 April 2021)

Other priests of this diocese who became bishops
Castor Paul Msemwa, appointed Coadjutor Bishop of Tunduru-Masasi in 2004
Norbert Wendelin Mtega, appointed Bishop of Iringa in  1985

See also
Roman Catholicism in Tanzania

Sources
 GCatholic.org
 Catholic Hierarchy

Njombe
Christian organizations established in 1968
Roman Catholic dioceses and prelatures established in the 20th century
Njombe, Roman Catholic Diocese of
1968 establishments in Tanzania